Kyondo Kasese is a sub county in Uganda, in the western part of Kasese District, in the Rwenzori region.

Kyondo Kasese is at the western end of the Uganda Railway to Kampala and Tororo and is home to Kasese Airport.

Geography
The city is near the Rwenzori Mountains and Queen Elizabeth National Park. 

It is approximately 360 kilometres (220 mi) by road, from Kampala; and about 36 kilometres (22 mi) by road, northeast from Mpondwe − the border town between Uganda and the Democratic Republic of the Congo (DRC).

The coordinates of Kasese are 0°11'12.0"N, 30°05'17.0"E (Latitude:0.186667; Longitude:30.088050).

References

Kasese District
Rwenzori Mountains